Aripert or Aribert may refer to:

Aripert I, king of the Lombards from 653 to 661 AD
Aripert II, king of the Lombards from 701 to 712 AD